The Newark Barge Bandits were a North Atlantic Baseball League baseball team that played from 1995 to 1996. They went 37-21 in their first year of existence, winning the league pennant. In 1996, they went 38-35. They played their home games at Colburn Park.

Major league player Kiko Garcia played for them.
Pitcher Germaine Hunter was drafted by the Boston Red Sox.
Catcher Rob Zachmann was drafted by the Seattle Mariners.

References

Defunct minor league baseball teams
Defunct independent baseball league teams
Defunct baseball teams in New York (state)
Baseball teams established in 1995
Sports clubs disestablished in 1996
1995 establishments in New York (state)
1996 disestablishments in New York (state)
Wayne County, New York
Baseball teams disestablished in 1996
North Atlantic League teams